Seal finger, also known as sealer's finger and  (from the Norwegian for "blubber"), is an infection that afflicts the fingers of seal hunters and other people who handle seals, as a result of bites or contact with exposed seal bones; it has also been contracted by exposure to untreated seal pelts. The State of Alaska Section of Epidemiology defines it as "a finger infection associated with bites, cuts, or scratches contaminated by the mouths, blood, or blubber of certain marine mammals".

It can cause cellulitis, joint inflammation, and swelling of the bone marrow; untreated, the course of "seal finger" is slow and results often in thickened contracted joint. Historically, seal finger was treated by amputation of the affected digits once they became unusable. It was first described scientifically in 1907.

The precise nature of the organism responsible for seal finger is unknown, as it has resisted culturing because most cases are promptly treated with antibiotics; however, as seal finger can be treated with tetracycline or similar antibiotics, the causative organism is most likely bacterial, or possibly fungal; in 1998, Baker, Ruoff, and Madoff showed that the organism is most likely a species of Mycoplasma called Mycoplasma phocacerebrale. This Mycoplasma was isolated in an epidemic of seal disease occurring in the Baltic Sea.

Notes

External links
 Working with Marine Mammals and Your Health, NOAA brochure on zoonoses, including seal finger. (requires Acrobat Reader (via archive.org))

Musculoskeletal disorders
Zoonoses
Seal hunting